Henry Clinton Attenburrow (19 September 1807 – 25 September 1881) was an English first-class cricketer. Attenburrow's batting style is unknown, though it is known he bowled right-arm underarm slow. He was born at Nottingham, Nottinghamshire.

Background

Attenburrow made a single first-class appearance for Nottinghamshire against England in 1847 at Trent Bridge. In England's first-innings of 105 all out, Attenburrow took four wickets. He opened the batting in Nottinghamshire's first-innings of 176 all out, scoring 3 runs before he was dismissed by Tom Hunt. In England second-innings of 82 all out, he took six wickets. Nottinghamshire were set twelve runs for victory, reaching their target without losing a wicket. The following season he made a single first-class appearance for Nottingham Cricket Club against Sheffield Cricket Club at Trent Bridge. In Sheffield's first-innings of 111 all out, Attenburrow took three wickets, while in Nottingham's first-innings of 36 all out he batted at number ten, where he was dismissed for a duck by Tom Hunt. He took two wickets in Sheffield's second-innings of 81 all out, which set Nottingham a target of 157 for victory. Nottingham were dismissed for 71 in their chase, with Attenburrow again dismissed for a duck by Hunt.

He died at Saint Brélade, Jersey on 25 September 1881.

References

External links

1807 births
1881 deaths
Cricketers from Nottingham
English cricketers
Nottinghamshire cricketers
Nottingham Cricket Club cricketers